The posterior inferior iliac spine (Sweeney's Tubercle) is an anatomical landmark that describes a bony "spine", or projection, at the posterior and inferior surface of the iliac bone.

It is one of two such spines on the posterior surface, the other being the posterior superior iliac spine. These two spines are separated by a bony notch. They appear as two dimples in the skin, at the level of the lower back.

The posterior inferior iliac spine corresponds with the posterior extremity of the auricular surface.

Additional images

References

Bones of the pelvis
Ilium (bone)